The 1956 United States presidential election in Maine took place on November 6, 1956, as part of the 1956 United States presidential election which was held throughout all contemporary 48 states. Voters chose five representatives, or electors to the Electoral College, who voted for president and vice president.

Maine overwhelmingly voted for the Republican nominee, incumbent President Dwight D. Eisenhower of Pennsylvania, over the Democratic nominee, former Governor Adlai Stevenson of Illinois. Eisenhower ran with incumbent Vice President Richard Nixon of California, while Stevenson's running mate was Senator Estes Kefauver of Tennessee.

Eisenhower won Maine by a landslide margin of 41.74%. Although the Pine Tree State was almost completely dominated by the Republican Party between 1856 and 1960 (apart from 1912 where the Republican vote was split), Eisenhower's performance is nonetheless the second-best by any presidential candidate in Maine, behind only Yankee Calvin Coolidge in 1924, who won a 1.16% higher share of the popular vote. He carried every county in Maine, and won thirteen of sixteen with over seventy percent of the vote. This election would prove the last of a century of GOP dominance in the Yankee Northeast: over the following two elections, the Republican share would decline 39% in Maine as the party moved its target support base from the declining Northeast to the "Sun Belt" of the lower-tax South and Desert Southwest.

With 70.87% of the popular vote, Maine would prove to be Eisenhower's second strongest state after nearby Vermont.

Results

Results by county

See also
 United States presidential elections in Maine

Notes

References

Maine
1956
1956 Maine elections